Tsonga may refer to:

 Tsonga language, a Bantu language spoken in southern Africa
 Tsonga people, a large group of people living mainly in southern Mozambique and South Africa.
 Jo-Wilfried Tsonga (born 1985), French tennis player

See also
 Dzongkha, a Sino-Tibetan language

Language and nationality disambiguation pages